Events in the year 1896 in music.

Specific locations
1896 in Norwegian music

Events 
March 18 – Danish composer Carl Nielsen conducts a performance of his First Symphony in Dresden; the event marks the beginning of his international success.
March 19 – Leo Stern is soloist in the première of Dvořák's Cello Concerto, in B minor, Op. 104, B. 191, at the Queen's Hall in London.
April 13 – Jean Sibelius conducts the world première of his Lemminkäinen Suite in Helsinki.
December 27 – Formal première of Ernest Chausson's Poème for violin and orchestra, Op. 25, with Eugène Ysaÿe as soloist, at Nancy, France.
Engelbert Humperdinck is created a professor of music by the Kaiser.
Gabriel Fauré takes over from Théodore Dubois as organist of the church of La Madeleine, Paris.
In Moscow, Mariya Kerzina and her husband Arkadiy Kerzin form the Circle of Russian Music Lovers, a performance society.

Published popular music 

 "All Coons Look Alike to Me"     w.m. Ernest Hogan
 "Årstiderna"     w.m. Alice Tegnér
 "The Amorous Goldfish"     w. Harry Greenbank m. Sidney Jones
 "Chin, Chin, Chinaman"     w. Harry Greenbank m. Sidney Jones
 "El Capitan March"     m. John Philip Sousa
 "Eli Green's Cakewalk"     w.m. David Reed & Sadie Koninsky
 "Elsie From Chelsea"     w.m. Harry Dacre
 "Going For A Pardon"     w. James Thornton & Clara Havenschild m. James Thornton
 "Happy Days In Dixie"     m. Kerry Mills
 "Hot Tamale Alley" by George M. Cohan
 "A Hot Time In The Old Town"     w. Joseph Hayden m. Theodore A. Metz
 "I Love You In The Same Old Way – Darling Sue"     w. Walter H. Ford m. John Walter Bratton
 "In The Baggage Coach Ahead"     w.m. Gussie L. Davis
 "A Jovial Monk Am I"     w. (Eng) Arthur Sturgess m. Edmond Audran
 "Kentucky Babe"     w. Richard Henry Buck m. Adam Geibel
 "Laugh And The World Laughs With You"     w. Ella Wheeler Wilcox m. Louis Gottschalk
 "Love Makes The World Go 'Round"     w. Clyde Fitch m. arr. William Furst
 "Mister Johnson, Turn Me Loose"     w.m. Ben Harney
 "Mother Was A Lady"     w. Edward B. Marks m. Joseph W. Stern
 "Musetta's Waltz Song"     m. Giacomo Puccini
 "My Gal Is A High Born Lady"     w.m. Barney Fagan arr. Gustave Luders
 "Remus Takes the Cake" by J. H. Ellis
 "The Saint Louis Cyclone" by Ren Shields & George Evans
 "Sambo at the Cakewalk" by Alfred E. Marks
 "Stars & Stripes Forever" by John Philip Sousa
 "Sweet Rosie O'Grady"  w.m. Maude Nugent
 "To A Wild Rose"     m. Edward MacDowell
 "Warmest Baby in the Bunch" by George M. Cohan
 "When the Saints Are Marching In"     w. Katharine E. Purvis m. James M. Black
 "You've Been a Good Old Wagon but You Done Broke Down"  w.m. Ben Harney

Recorded popular music 

"All Coons Look Alike To Me" (w.m. Ernest Hogan)  –  Dan W. Quinn on Edison Records
"The Amorous Goldfish" (w. Harry Greenbank m. Sidney Jones)  –  Dan W. Quinn on Edison Records
"And Her Golden Hair Was Hanging Down Her Back" (w. Monroe H. Rosenfeld m. Felix McGlennon)  –  Maud Foster on Berliner Records
"Annie Laurie" (w. William Douglas m. Lady John Douglas Scott)  –  George J. Gaskin on Edison –  Edison Male Quartette on Edison
"Auld Lang Syne" (w. adapted Robert Burns)  –  Edison Male Quartette on Edison
"The Band Played On" (w. John F. Palmer m. Charles B. Ward)  –  Dan W. Quinn on Columbia records and Berliner
"The Belle Of Avenoo A" (w.m. Safford Waters)  –  Dan W. Quinn on Berliner
"Ben Bolt" (w. Thomas Dunn English m. Nelson Kneass)  –  George J. Gaskin on Berliner
"The Blue Danube" (m. Johann Strauss)  – Edison Grand Concert Band on Edison
"Chin, Chin, Chinaman" (w. Harry Greenbank m. Sidney Jones)  –  Dan W. Quinn on Edison
"La Donna è Mobile" (w. Francesco Piave m. Giuseppe Verdi)  –  Ferruccio Giannini on Berliner
"Don't You Hear Dem Bells?" (w.m. D. S. McCosh)  –  Brilliant Quartet on Berliner
"Down In Poverty Row" (w. Gussie L. Davis m. Arthur Trevelyan)  –  Dan W. Quinn on Berliner –  George J. Gaskin on Edison
"Elsie From Chelsea" (w.m. Harry Dacre)  –  Dan W. Quinn on Edison
"Funiculì, Funiculà" (w. G. Turco m. Luigi Denza)  –  Ferruccio Giannini on Berliner
"The Future Mrs 'Awkins" (w.m. Albert Chevalier)  –  George J. Gaskin on Berliner
"The Gladiators" (m. John Philip Sousa)  – Edison Grand Concert Band on Edison
"Hallelujah Chorus" (w. Charles Jennes m. George Frideric Handel)  – Edison Grand Concert Band on Edison
"The Holy City" (w. Frederick Edward Weatherly m. Stephen Adams)  –  Ferruccio Giannini on Berliner
"Home Sweet Home" (w. John Howard Payne m. Sir Henry Rowley Bishop)  –  George J. Gaskin on Edison
"The Honeymoon" (m. George Rosey)  – Edison Grand Concert Band on Edison
"I Don't Want To Play In Your Yard" (w. Philip Wingate m. Henry W. Petrie)  –  George J. Gaskin on Berliner –  Maud Foster on Berliner
"In The Baggage Coach Ahead" (w.m. Gussie L. Davis)  –  George J. Gaskin on Edison – Dan W. Quinn
"I'se Gwine Back To Dixie" (w.m. C. A. White)  –  Brilliant Quartet on Berliner
"I've Been Hoodoed" – Dan W. Quinn on Berliner
"Just Tell Them That You Saw Me" (w.m. Paul Dresser)  –  George J. Gaskin on Berliner –  Dan W. Quinn on Berliner
"Kathleen" (w.m. Helene Mora)  –  George J. Gaskin on Edison
"Kathleen Mavourneen" (w. Annie Crawford (Barry) m. Frederick William Nichols Crouch)  –  George J. Gaskin on Berliner
"King Cotton March" (m. John Philip Sousa)  – Edison Grand Concert Band on Edison
"Listen to the Mocking Bird" (w. Alice Hawthorne m. Richard Milburn)  – whistling Billy Golden on Edison
"The Lost Chord" (w. Adelaide Anne Procter m. Sir Arthur Sullivan)  – Edison Grand Concert Band on Edison
"Marching Through Georgia" (w.m. Henry Clay Work)  –  George J. Gaskin on Berliner
"La Marseillaise" (w.m. Claude Joseph Rouget de Lisle)  –  Ferruccio Giannini on Berliner
"McKinley is our Man"  – Dan W. Quinn on U.S. Phonograph Records
"My Angeline" (w. Harry B. Smith m. Victor Herbert)  –  Frank Daniels on Berliner
"My Best Girl's A New Yorker" (w.m. John Stromberg)  –  Dan W. Quinn on Berliner
"My Gal Is A High Born Lady" (w.m. Barney Fagan arr. Gustave Luders)  –  George J. Gaskin on Edison –  Dan W. Quinn on Berliner
"My Pearl Is A Bowery Girl" (w. William Jerome m. Andrew Mack)  –  George J. Gaskin on Berliner
"Nearer, My God, To Thee" (w. Sarah F. Adams m. Lowell Mason)  –  J. W. Myers on Berliner –  Len Spencer & Roger Harding on Columbia
"Onward, Christian Soldiers" (w. Rev. Sabine Baring-Gould m. Sir Arthur Sullivan)  –  J. W. Myers on Berliner
"The Palms" (Jean-Baptiste Faure)  –  Ferruccio Giannini on Berliner
"La Paloma" (w. anon m. Sebastian Yradier)  –  Ferruccio Giannini on Berliner
"Private Tommy Atkins" (w. Henry Hamilton m. S. Potter)  –  George J. Gaskin on Berliner
"Put Me Off at Buffalo" (Dillon Brothers, w. Harry Dillon m. John Dillon)  –  Dan W. Quinn on Berliner
"Rock Of Ages" (w. Augustus Montague Toplady m. Thomas Hasting)  –  J. W. Myers on Berliner
"'Round His Bed I'm Goin' To Creep"  –  Len Spencer on Columbia
"Sally In Our Alley" (w. Henry Carey m. trad)  –  Edison Male Quartette on Edison –  George J. Gaskin on Berliner
"She Is More To Be Pitied Than Censured" (w.m. William B. Gray)  –  Steve Porter on Columbia
"She May Have Seen Better Days" (w.m. James Thornton)  –  Dan W. Quinn on Berliner
"The Sidewalks Of New York" (w.m. Charles B. Lawlor & James W. Blake)  –  George J. Gaskin on Edison and on Berliner
"The Streets Of Cairo" (w.m. James Thornton)  –  Dan W. Quinn on Berliner
"The Sunshine Of Paradise Alley" (w. Walter H. Ford m. John Walter Bratton)  –  George J. Gaskin on Berliner
"Tenting On The Old Camp Ground" (w.m. Walter Kittredge)  –  George J. Gaskin on Berliner
"Then You'll Remember Me" (w. Alfred Bunn m. Michael William Balfe)  –  Ferruccio Giannini on Berliner
"There's Only One Girl In the World For Me" (w.m. Dave Marion)  –  J. W. Myers on Berliner
"They Are The Best Friends Of All"  –  Helene Mora on US Phonograph Records
"Toreador Song" (w. Henri Meilhac, Ludovic Halévy m. Georges Bizet)  –  J. W. Myers on Berliner
"Tramp, Tramp, Tramp" (w.m. George Frederick Root)  –  George J. Gaskin on Berliner
"Trilby Song"  –  Maurice Farkoa with  piano Frank Lambert on Berliner
"Watchman Tell Us Of The Night" (Bowring, Mason)  –  J. W. Myers on Berliner
"'Way Down Yonder In The Cornfield"  –  Columbia Quartette on Columbia
"When Johnny Comes Marching Home" (w.m. Louis Lambert)  –  George J. Gaskin on Berliner
"Where Is My Wandering Boy, Tonight?" (w.m. Rev. R. Lowry)  –  J. W. Myers on Berliner
"Wot Cher!" (w. Albert Chevalier m. Charles Ingle)  –  George J. Gaskin on Berliner

Classical music
Eyvind Alnæs – Symphony No. 1
 Amy Beach
 Symphony in E minor "Gaelic"
 Violin Sonata
 Johannes Brahms
 Vier ernste Gesänge
 Eleven Chorale Preludes for organ
 Anton Bruckner – Symphony No. 9 (finished three movements, sketches of finale)
 Ernest Chausson – Poème for violin and orchestra
 Cornelis Dopper – Symphony No. 1
 Antonín Dvořák
 The Water Goblin
 The Noon-Day Witch (and two other "Erben tone-poems", given their premiere later in the year in London)
 Quartet in A-flat major Op. 105
 The Wild Dove, Op.110
Louis Ganne – Extase
 Gustav Holst – Quintet for piano and winds
 Vincent d'Indy – Istar
Charles Ives – String Quartet no. 1, From the Salvation Army
Edward MacDowell – Woodland Sketches
Albéric Magnard – Symphony No. 3 Opus 11 (1895–96)
Gustav Mahler – Symphony No. 3 completed
Hans Pfitzner – Piano Trio in F Opus 8
Sergei Rachmaninoff – Symphony No. 1 (1895–96)
Maurice Ravel 
"D'Anne jouant de l'espinette"
La parade 
"Sainte"
Camille Saint-Saëns
Piano Concerto No. 5 ("Egyptian")
Violin Sonata No. 2
Alexander Scriabin
24 Preludes for Piano, Op. 11
5 Preludes for Piano, Op. 15
Piano Concerto in F-sharp minor, Op. 20
Jean Sibelius – Coronation Cantata
Richard Strauss – Also sprach Zarathustra
George Templeton Strong – 4 Poems, Op.36
Francisco Tárrega – Recuerdos de la Alhambra
Alexander von Zemlinsky
String Quartet No. 1
Trio for Clarinet, Cello and Piano

Opera
August Enna – Aucassin og Nicolette
Zdeněk Fibich – Hedy, premiered February 12 in Prague
Gialdino Gialdini – La Pupilla premiered October 23 at the Societá Filarmonica Drammatica, Trieste
Umberto Giordano – Andrea Chénier
Paul Juon – Aleko
Ruggiero Leoncavallo – Chatterton
Friedrich Lux – The Duchess of Athens
Giacomo Puccini – La Bohème, Teatro Regio in Turin.
Nikolai Rimsky-Korsakov – Sadko
Charles Villiers Stanford – Shamus O'Brien (revised 1907)
Hugo Wolf – Der Corregidor

Musical theater

 The Art Of Maryland     Broadway production
 El Capitan     Broadway production
 The Circus Girl     London production
 The Gay Parisienne     London production
 The Geisha     London production
 The Geisha     Broadway production
 The Girl From Paris     London production
 The Grand Duke     London production

Births 
January 20 – Elmer Diktonius, poet and composer (d. 1961)
January 25 – Florence Mills, cabaret and jazz performer (d. 1927)
January 28 – Elsie Carlisle, English singer (d. 1977)
February 3 – Kid Thomas Valentine, jazz trumpeter (d. 1987)
February 22 – Nacio Herb Brown, US songwriter (d. 1964)
March 1 – Dimitris Mitropoulos, pianist, conductor and composer (d. 1960)
April 10 – Edith Day, US actress, singer and dancer (d. 1971)
April 30 – Reverend Gary Davis (d. 1972)
June 20 – Wilfrid Pelletier, conductor (d. 1982)
August 2 – Lorenzo Herrera, singer and composer (d. 1960)
August 15 – Léon Theremin, Russian inventor of the musical instrument named after him (d. 1993)
September 2 – Amanda Randolph, actress and singer (d. 1967)
September 8 – Howard Dietz, lyricist (d. 1983)
September 10 – Adele Astaire, US dancer and singer (d. 1981)
September 15 – Bert Ambrose, English bandleader and violinist (d. 1971)
September 25 – Roberto Gerhard, composer (d. 1970)
October 7 – Phil Ohman, US bandleader (d. 1954)
October 18 – Friedrich Hollaender, composer (d. 1976)
October 28 – Howard Hanson, composer (d. 1981)
October 31 – Ethel Waters, singer (d. 1977)
November 23 – Ruth Etting, US singer (d. 1978)
November 25 – Virgil Thomson, composer and critic (d. 1989)
December 6 – Ira Gershwin, lyricist (d. 1983)
December 12 – Jenö Ádám, conductor, composer and music teacher (d. 1982)
December 21 – Leroy Robertson, composer and music teacher (d. 1971)
December 28 – Roger Sessions, composer (d. 1985)

Deaths 
January 28 – Sir Joseph Barnby, conductor and composer (b. 1838)
February 5 – Henry David Leslie, conductor and composer (b. 1822)
February 6 – Juliette Dorus-Gras, operatic soprano (born 1896)
February 12 – Ambroise Thomas, composer (b. 1811)
February 13 – Carl Martin Reinthaler, organist, conductor and composer (b. 1822)
March 5 – Hiromori Hayashi, composer (b. 1831)
April 12 – Alexander Ritter, composer and violinist (b. 1833)
May 12 – Juan Morel Campos, danza composer (b. 1857)
May 20 – Clara Schumann, Austrian composer (b. 1819)
June 7 – Pavlos Carrer, composer (b. 1829)
June 22 – Sir Augustus Harris, librettist and impresario (b. 1852)
June 28 – Jenny Hill, music hall performer (b. 1848; tuberculosis)
July 14 – Luther Whiting Mason, music educator (b. 1818)
July 17 – Alfred Novello, music publisher (b. 1810)
July 26 – Théodore Salomé, organist and composer (b. 1834)
August 1 – Wilhelm Herman Barth, violinist, composer and music theorist (b. 1813)
August 18 – Frederick Crouch, cellist and composer (b. 1808)
September 16 – Antônio Carlos Gomes, composer (b. 1836)
September 22 – Katharina Klafsky, Wagnerian soprano (b. 1855)
September 23 – Gilbert Duprez, operatic tenor (b. 1806)
October 11 – Anton Bruckner, Austrian composer (b. 1824)
October 17 – Henry Eugene Abbey, theatre manager (b. 1846)
November 25 – Spyridon Xyndas, composer (b. 1812)
December 3 – László Erkel, Hungarian composer, son of Ferenc Erkel
December 13 – Wilhelm Joseph von Wasielewski, musicologist, conductor, and composer (b. 1822)
December 17 – Richard Pohl, writer, critic and composer (b. 1826)
December 24 – Anders Ljungqvist, fiddler (b. 1815)
date unknown
Luigia Abbadia, operatic mezzo-soprano (b. 1821)
Gopalakrishna Bharati, poet and Carnatic music composer (b. 1810)

See also 

 List of musical events

References

 
1890s in music
19th century in music
Music by year